Jim O'Dea (born 2 February 1949) is a former Australian rules footballer who played 167 games with St Kilda in the VFL from 1967 until 1980. He played a season at Dandenong in the VFA.

O'Dea was a defender who usually played across half back. He is known for an infamous incident which took place at the Moorabbin Oval during Round 14 of the 1972 season when he felled Collingwood player John Greening behind play. Greening suffered horrendous injuries and was lucky not to die as a result, and O'Dea was lucky not to be suspended for more than just ten weeks.

After retiring from VFL football Jim coached St.Kilda Under 19’s and reserves teams and was a club board member in the early 2000’s.

External links

1949 births
Living people
Australian rules footballers from Victoria (Australia)
St Kilda Football Club players
Dandenong Football Club players